The 2020 CS Warsaw Cup was scheduled to be held in November 2020 in Warsaw, Poland. It was part of the 2020–21 ISU Challenger Series. Medals would have been awarded in the disciplines of men's and ladies' singles.

On October 10, 2020, the Polish Figure Skating Association released information for competitors regarding traveling to Poland during the COVID-19 pandemic.

As with the prior two Challenger events, only European skaters were entered for the event.

The ice dance portion of the event was cancelled on November 6. The event was cancelled entirely on November 10, after a large number of withdrawals in men's singles significantly reduced the number of countries.

Entries 
The International Skating Union published the list of entries on October 14, 2020.

Changes to preliminary assignments

References 

CS Warsaw Cup
Warsaw Cup
CS Warsaw Cup